Mow Ching Yin (born 5 June 1995) is a Hong Kong road and track cyclist, who currently rides for UCI Continental team .

Major results

2014
 2nd Road race, National Junior Road Championships
2015
 National Under-23 Road Championships
2nd Road race
3rd Time trial
 5th Road race, National Road Championships
2016
 National Road Championships
2nd Road race
3rd Time trial
 2nd Time trial, National Under-23 Road Championships
2017
 1st  Points race, National Track Championships
 2nd Time trial, National Under-23 Road Championships
 3rd  Team time trial, Asian Road Championships
2018
 2nd  Team pursuit, Asian Games
 3rd  Team time trial, Asian Road Championships
 4th Time trial, National Road Championships
2019
 3rd  Team time trial, Asian Road Championships
 4th Time trial, National Road Championships

References

External links

1995 births
Living people
Hong Kong male cyclists
Asian Games medalists in cycling
Cyclists at the 2014 Asian Games
Cyclists at the 2018 Asian Games
Medalists at the 2018 Asian Games
Asian Games silver medalists for Hong Kong